Sarn Meyllteyrn is a village and former civil parish (known at the time as Mellteyrn) in the Welsh county of Gwynedd. It is in the west of the Llŷn Peninsula, 8.4 miles (13.5 km) west of Pwllheli and 24.3 miles (39.2 km) south-west of Caernarfon. The village is often referred to simply as Sarn. The parish was abolished in 1934 and divided between the communities of Botwnnog and Tudweiliog.

History

Governance
For elections to Gwynedd Council, the village forms part of the electoral division of Botwnnog, Dwyfor, electing one councillor. Gwenno Glyn of Llais Gwynedd was elected in 2012.

Geography
The river Soch runs through the village on its way to Abersoch. The village lies in a small valley with Mynydd Rhiw to the South, Mynydd Cefnamlwch to the North and Carn Fadryn to the North-East.

Education
Primary education is provided by Ysgol Pont y Gôf, in the nearby village of Botwnnog. The school is in the Ysgol Botwnnog catchment area and this is where the majority of pupils go on to complete secondary education.

Transport
Sarn Meyllteyrn lies on the B4413 between Llanbedrog and Aberdaron. Buses from Pwllheli to Aberdaron and Uwchmynydd serve the village and are operated by Nefyn Coaches and Arriva Buses Wales.  The nearest railway station is at Pwllheli.

References

Villages in Gwynedd
Botwnnog